Zubarevka is a rural locality (a khutor) in Karshevitskoye Rural Settlement, Leninsky District, Volgograd Oblast, Russia. The population was 54 as of 2010.

Geography 
Zubarevka is located 34 km southeast of Leninsk (the district's administrative centre) by road. 5-y Leskhoz is the nearest rural locality.

References 

Rural localities in Leninsky District, Volgograd Oblast